The 2019 Norwegian Second Division was a third-tier Norwegian women's football league season. The league consisted of 68 teams divided into 7 groups. KIL/Hemne were promoted. Reserve teams were not eligible for promotion.

League tables

Group 1
Frigg − promotion play-offs
Raufoss
Lyn 2
Sarpsborg 08
Kongsvinger
Fart 2
Stabæk 2
Høybråten og Stovner
Vålerenga 2
Ullensaker/Kisa
Ottestad
Drøbak-Frogn − relegated

Group 2
Sandefjord − promotion play-offs
LSK Kvinner 2
Gimletroll
Øvrevoll Hosle 2
Kolbotn 2
Røa 2
Eik Tønsberg
Grei 2
Stathelle
Hallingdal
Urædd/Pors
Lier − relegated

Group 3
Viking − promotion play-offs
Bryne
Fyllingsdalen
Stord
Haugar
Klepp 2
Staal Jørpeland
Avaldsnes 2
Arna-Bjørnar 2
Voss − relegated
Vestsiden-Askøy − relegated
Hinna − relegated

Group 4
KIL/Hemne − promotion play-offs
Fortuna Ålesund (subsequently rebranded AaFK Fortuna)
Trondheims-Ørn 2
Molde
Herd
Hødd
Træff
Nardo
Sunndal − relegated

Group 5
Innstranden − group 5/6 play-off
Bossmo & Ytteren − group 5/6 play-off
Grand Bodø 2
Halsøy
Innstranden 2/Tverlandet
Fauske/Sprint
Sandnessjøen

Group 6
Mjølner − group 5/6 play-off
Medkila 2 − group 5/6 play-off
Sortland
Medkila 3
Svolvær/Henningsvær/Kabelvåg
Stokmarknes/Morild
Ballstad/Leknes
Harstad

Group 5/6 play-off
Mjølner − promotion play-offs
Bossmo & Ytteren
Innstranden
Medkila 2

Group 7
Tromsø − promotion play-offs
Bossekop
Tromsdalen
Fløya 2
Porsanger
Polarstjernen
Senja/Finnsnes
Tverrelvdalen

Promotion play-offs

First stage

Group 1
Frigg − advance to second stage
Viking
Tromsø

Group 2
KIL/Hemne − advance to second stage
Sandefjord
Mjølner

Second stage
Frigg 1–2  KIL/Hemne

Third stage
KIL/Hemne went on to play Grand Bodø over two legs in the play-off final. KIL/Hemne won 5–4 on aggregate and were promoted to the 2020 Norwegian First Division.

References
General
2019 Norwegian Second Division at RSSSF
Specific

Norwegian Second Division (women) seasons
3
Norway
Norway